.tn is the Internet country code top-level domain (ccTLD) for Tunisia.

Second-level domains 

Registrations can be made directly at the second level, or at the third level beneath these names (some of which are restricted):

 .com.tn
 .ens.tn
 .fin.tn
 .gov.tn
 .ind.tn
 .intl.tn
 .nat.tn
 .net.tn
 .org.tn
 .info.tn
 .perso.tn
 .tourism.tn
 .mincom.tn

References

External links
 IANA .tn whois information
 .tn domain registrars list

Country code top-level domains
Communications in Tunisia
Internet in Tunisia